The 125th Ohio Infantry Regiment, sometimes 125th Ohio Volunteer Infantry (or 125th OVI) was an infantry regiment in the Union Army during the American Civil War.

Service
The 125th Ohio Infantry was organized at Camp Taylor, Cleveland, Ohio, and mustered in three years of service on October 6, 1862, under the command of colonel Emerson Opdycke.

The regiment was attached to 3rd Brigade, 1st Division, XXI Corps (Union Army), in Major General William S. Rosecrans' Army of the Cumberland, till October 1863. 3rd Brigade, 2nd Division, IV Corps (Union Army) of the Cumberland, till October, 1864. 1st Brigade, 2nd Division, 4th Army Corps and Dept. of Texas, till September, 1865.  The 125th Ohio Infantry mustered out of service on September 25, 1865.

Primarily involved in long marches and skirmishes until Battle of Chickamauga, fighting against the odds. After Chickamauga, Gen. Rosecrans was replaced by Maj. Gen. George H. Thomas, 'The Rock of Chickamauga'.

The 125th then participated in the Battle of Missionary Ridge, and helped to push Braxton Bragg's men away from Chattanooga, Tennessee. In the spring of 1864, it joined William Tecumseh Sherman in his Atlanta Campaign. They fought all the way until the end, at the Battle of Jonesborough, and then preceded to follow confederate Lt. Gen. John Bell Hood North to  Nashville, Tennessee

In Colonel Opdycke's brigade, it fought in Battle of Franklin and the union victory at Nashville. The 125th OVI gained a high reputation for its fighting qualities.

Casualties
The regiment lost a total of 225 men during service; 7 officers and 104 enlisted men killed or mortally wounded, 114 enlisted men died of disease.

Commanders
 Colonel - Emerson Opdycke
 Lt. Colonel - Henry B. Banning
 Captain Edward P. Bates
 Major George L. Wood
 Major Joseph Bruff
 Lt. Colonel Thomas H. Moore
 Adjutant Ridgley C. Powers

Gallery

References
Larry Stevens' Ohio in the Civil War web site for the 125th Ohio Infantry

Military units and formations established in 1862
Military units and formations disestablished in 1865
Units and formations of the Union Army from Ohio
1862 establishments in Ohio